Igor Marchenko (born 5 July 1977) is a Ukrainian former pair skater. He competed with Evgenia Filonenko. They placed 11th at the 1998 Winter Olympics. They won two medals at the World Junior Figure Skating Championships, a silver in 1996 and a bronze in 1995. They are the 1998 Ukrainian national champions. He is the brother of Illya Marchenko, a Ukrainian male tennis player.

Results
(with Filonenko)

References
 Skatabase: Junior Worlds
 Skatabase: 1998 Olympics

External links
 Pairs on Ice: Evgeni Filonenko / Igor Marchenko

1977 births
Living people
Ukrainian male pair skaters
Olympic figure skaters of Ukraine
Figure skaters at the 1998 Winter Olympics
World Junior Figure Skating Championships medalists
Sportspeople from Dnipro